Pacific Division of the U. S. Army was one of its superior administrative organizations that existed during the early 19th century and for a short time in the early 20th century.

Pacific Division 1848–1853 
The first Pacific Division of the U.S. Army was created on October 10, 1848, as the Army reorganized its administration for the new territories acquired during the Mexican–American War. 10th Military Department (California) and 11th Military Department (Oregon Territory) were subordinated to the new Division that had its headquarters at Monterey. In June 1849 division headquarters moved to the California, for a month then moved to Benicia and the Benicia Arsenal in the upper San Francisco Bay in July 1849.

On May 17, 1851, the Army merged Military Departments 10 and 11 into the Pacific Division as the Army again reorganized its administration on the West Coast. Both of those military departments merged into the Pacific Division ceased to exist. Division headquarters directly administered affairs in California and Oregon Territory. On June 15, 1852, Pacific Division headquarters was moved from Benicia to the San Francisco.

On October 31, 1853, the Pacific Division was replaced by the Department of the Pacific, with headquarters at San Francisco. It was created when the Army abandoned the system of divisions and numbered departments, establishing departments having a descriptive name, and reporting directly to Army Headquarters.

Commander of the Pacific Division 
 Major General Persifor Frazer Smith October 10, 1848–1849
 Brevet Major General Bennet Riley 1849–1851
 Brevet Brigadier General Ethan A. Hitchcock 1851–1853

Posts in Military Department 10 
 Post at Monterey, Monterey, 1847–1852
 Monterey Ordnance Depot 1852–1856
 Sonoma Barracks, Sonoma, 1847–1852.
 Camp Sonoma, near Sonoma, 1847–1851
 Sonoma Post, near Sonoma, 1852–1858
 Camp San José, San Jose, 1848
 Camp Anderson, Sacramento, 1849
 Camp Stanislaus, Riverbank, California, 1849
 Camp Riley, near Otay, 1849
 Camp Salvation, Calexico, 1849
 Camp San Miguel, Mission San Miguel Arcángel, 1849–1851
 Benicia Barracks, Benicia, 1849–1898
 Fort Far West, near Marysville, 1849–1852.
 Angel Island Military Reservation, Angel Island 1850–1863
 Camp Rancho de Chino, Chino, 1850–1852
 Camp San Luis Rey, San Luis Rey, 1850–1852
 Camp Frederica, 7 miles from Durham's Ferry, near San Joaquin City, California, 1850
 Camp Vallecito, 1850, now Vallecito County Park
 Vallecito Depot,  1851–1853
 Fort Defiance, near Winterhaven, 1850
 Camp Santa Isabel, Santa Ysabel, 1851–1852
 Camp McClear, Fresno, 1851
 New San Diego Depot, 1851–1866
 Fort Miller, 1851–1858
 Fort Yuma, 1851–1883
 Benicia Arsenal, Benicia, 1852–1964
 Camp Crane, Bass Lake, 1852
 Camp Fitzgerald, near Winterhaven, California 1852
 Camp Rancho del Jurupa, Rubidoux, 1852–1854
 Fort Reading, Redding, 1852–1856
 Fort Jones, Fort Jones, California, 1852–1858
 Fort Humboldt, 1853–1867

Posts in Military Department 11 
 Fort Colville, Washington Territory, 1859–1882
 Fort Steilacoom, Washington Territory, (1849–1868)
 Fort Dalles, Oregon, 1850–1867
 Fort Vancouver, Washington Territory, 1849-1889

Pacific Division, 1904–07 
Several Departments were again organized under new Divisions in 1903. The previous Division of the Pacific (1869-91) was re-established and formally stood up in 1904 as the Pacific Division with subordinate or related commands, including the Department of California (to include the Hawaiian Islands) and the Department of the Columbia. The Pacific Division was headquartered at Fort Mason, San Francisco. By the end of 1907, the War Department, under Secretary of War William Howard Taft from February 1, 1904 – June 30, 1908, had eliminated the echelon of administrative units called Divisions and subsequently the Pacific Division that same year.

Commander of the Pacific Division 
 Major General Arthur MacArthur 1903 - 1907

References

Departments and districts of the United States Army
Military units and formations in California
Military in Oregon
Military history of Washington (state)
Military units and formations established in 1848